Year 252 (CCLII) was a leap year starting on Thursday (link will display the full calendar) of the Julian calendar. At the time, it was known as the Year of the Consulship of Trebonianus and Volusianus (or, less frequently, year 1005 Ab urbe condita). The denomination 252 for this year has been used since the early medieval period, when the Anno Domini calendar era became the prevalent method in Europe for naming years.

Events 
 By place 
 Roman Empire 
 Battle of Barbalissos: King Shapur I defeats the Roman army (some 70,000 men) at Barbalissos in Syria (approximate date).

 Persia 
 Shapur I puts down the revolt in Khorasan (Iran and Turkmenistan), and rejoins his army. 
 Shapur I invades Armenia and appoints Artavazd VI as the new Armenian king. 
 Georgia submits peacefully to Shapur I and becomes a vassal of the Sassanid Empire.

 Asia 
 Sun Liang succeeds his father Sun Quan, as emperor of the Chinese state of Eastern Wu.

 By topic 
 Religion 
 Pope Cornelius is exiled to Centumcellae, by Emperor Trebonianus Gallus.

Births 
 Eusignius of Antioch, Roman general and martyr (d. 362)
 Wang Jun (or Pengzu), Chinese general and warlord (d. 314)
 Wei Huacun, founder of the Shangqing sect of Daoism (d. 334)

Deaths 
 May 21 – Sun Quan, founder of the Eastern Wu state (b. 182) 
 Pan (or Pan Shu), Chinese empress of the Eastern Wu state
 Tian Yu (or Guorang), Chinese general and politician (b. 171)
 Tiridates II (or Khosrov), Roman client king of Armenia

References